Manuela Abril Martelli Salamovich (born April 16, 1983 in Santiago) is a Chilean film and television actress and director best known for her roles in the films B-Happy and Machuca. She starred with the famous Dutch actor Rutger Hauer in the Chilean-Italian film Il Futuro, based on Roberto Bolaño's novel A Little Lumpen Novelita. Her first feature film 1976 was shown at the 2022 Cannes Film Festival at the Director's Fortnight section.

Early life 
On April 16, 1983, Martelli was born in Santiago de Chile. Martelli's parents are Nicolás Martelli, of Italian descent, and Marian Salamovich, of Croatian descent.

Education 
Martelli studied at Saint George's College, Santiago and later studied drama at the Pontificia Universidad Católica de Chile.

Career 
Martelli played the main role in the film B-Happy by Gonzalo Justiniano. Later she had roles in the TV series Huaiquimán y Tolosa and movies like Machuca, Radio Corazón and Malta con Huevo. In 2010 she appeared in Canal 13's telenovela Feroz.

Filmography

Films

Telenovelas

TV series

References

External links
 

1983 births
21st-century Chilean actresses
Chilean television actresses
Chilean film actresses
Chilean people of Italian descent
Chilean people of Croatian descent
Living people
Actresses from Santiago
Pontifical Catholic University of Chile alumni